Steinfeld is a name of German origin, meaning "stone field". A variant spelling is Steinfeldt. It may refer to:

Places

Germany
Steinfeld, Bavaria, a town in the district of Main-Spessart, Bavaria
Steinfeld, Lower Saxony, a municipality in the district of Vechta, Lower Saxony
Steinfeld, Mecklenburg-Vorpommern, a municipality in the district of Bad Doberan, Mecklenburg-Vorpommern
Raben Steinfeld, a municipality in the district of Parchim, Mecklenburg-Vorpommern
Steinfeld, Rhineland-Palatinate, a municipality in the district Südliche Weinstraße, Rhineland-Palatinate
Steinfeld, Saxony-Anhalt, a municipality in the district of Stendal in Saxony-Anhalt in Germany
Steinfeld, Schleswig-Holstein, a municipality in the district of Schleswig-Flensburg in Schleswig-Holstein in Germany

Austria
Steinfeld, Austria, a municipality in Carinthia in Austria

Australia
 Steinfeld, South Australia, also known as Stonefield

People
Franz Steinfeld (1787–1868), Austrian painter
Hailee Steinfeld (born 1996), American actress, singer and model
Harry Steinfeldt (1877–1914), American baseball player
Jake Steinfeld (born 1958), American actor and fitness instructor
William M. Steinfeldt (1917–2006), New York politician
Edward Steinfeld (born 1966), Director of the Watson Institute for International and Public Affairs at Brown University